Servus is a salutation in Central and Eastern Europe.

Servus may also refer to:

Servus Credit Union, a Canadian financial institution
ServusTV, an Austrian TV channel
Servus, Latin for slave; see Slavery in ancient Rome

See also